Venus Williams was the defending champion and successfully defended her title, by defeating Monica Seles 6–2, 6–3 in the final.

Seeds
All seeds received a bye into the second round.

Draw

Finals

Top half

Section 1

Section 2

Bottom half

Section 3

Section 4

External links
 Official results archive (ITF)
 Official results archive (WTA)

Southern California Open
2001 WTA Tour